The list of shipwrecks in May 1826 includes some ships sunk, foundered, grounded, or otherwise lost during May 1826.

2 May

4 May

7 May

8 May

9 May

10 May

11 May

12 May

13 May

15 May

16 May

17 May

18 May

19 May

22 May

24 May

26 May

28 May

29 May

30 May

31 May

Unknown date

References

1826-05